

Transfers

In:

 

Out:

Matches

Goalscorers

References

Iran Premier League Statistics
Persian League

Foolad F.C. seasons
Foolad